Chen Yi (born April 4, 1953) is a Chinese-American violinist and composer of contemporary classical music.  She was the first Chinese woman to receive a Master of Arts (M.A.) in music composition from the Central Conservatory of Music in Beijing. Chen was a finalist for the 2006 Pulitzer Prize for Music for her composition Si Ji (Four Seasons), and has received awards from the Koussevistky Music Foundation and American Academy of Arts and Letters (Lieberson Award), as well as fellowships from the Guggenheim Foundation  and the National Endowment for the Arts. In 2010, she was awarded an Honorary Doctorate from The New School and in 2012, she was awarded the Brock Commission from the American Choral Directors Association. She was elected to the American Academy of Arts and Letters in 2019.

Early life
Chen Yi and her siblings began studying classical music at age three as their parents were lovers of the genre. She began learning on piano and at age four was introduced to violin. She memorized works by classical composers like Mozart, Bach, Beethoven, and Tchaikovsky and was able to sing their compositions note for note.

During the Cultural Revolution, Chen and her siblings were taken to a work camp in the countryside. She continued to play violin, but was only allowed to perform "revolutionary songs". At age 17, she became concertmaster of the Peking Opera in Beijing. In 1978, Chen was admitted to the Central Conservatory of Music where she received a bachelor's and master's degree. In addition, she spent summers studying Chinese folk music and considers this research to be an important part of her musical development.

Career

Chen lived in New York City for many years and studied composition at Columbia University, earning a DMA with distinction. Her teachers included Wu Zu-qiang in Beijing as well as Chou Wen-chung and Mario Davidovsky in New York. Since 1998, Chen has been the Lorena Cravens/Millsap/Missouri Distinguished Professor at the University of Missouri–Kansas City Conservatory of Music and Dance. Previously, she was on faculty at the Peabody Institute in Baltimore, Maryland. She is married to composer Zhou Long, a fellow alumnus of the Central Conservatory of Music in Beijing and fellow professor at the University of Missouri-Kansas City.

Alongside a great number of orchestral works, Chen has also made many contributions to the choral repertoire and the chamber music repertoire, including works written for traditional Chinese instruments. Chen's works are published by the Theodore Presser Company.

Works

Solo

Ba Ban, for piano (1999)
Bamboo Dance, for solo piano (2014)
Duo Ye, for piano (2000)
Guessing, for piano (2000)
Ji-Dong-Nuo, for piano (2007)
Jing Marimba, for solo marimba (2010)
Memory, for solo cello (2011)
Memory, for solo flute (2011)
Memory, for solo violin (2011)
Monologue (Impressions on 'The True Story Of Ah Q'), for unaccompanied alto saxophone (2000)
Monologue (Impressions on 'The True Story of Ah Q'), for unaccompanied B-flat clarinet (2000)
Northern Scenes, for solo piano (2015)
Percussion Concerto, percussion with piano (1998)
Points, for solo pipa (1991)
Shuo Chang, for solo guitar (2014)
Singing in the Mountain, for piano (2005)
Totem Poles, for organ (2020)
Two Chinese Bagatelles, piano solo for children (2000)
Variations on "Awariguli", for piano solo (2011)

Chamber ensemble (2 performers)

Ancient Dances, for pipa and percussion (2005)
Bright Moonlight, for voice and piano (2004)
China West Suite, for two pianos (2007)
China West Suite, for marimba and piano (2008)
Chinese Ancient Dances, for B-flat clarinet and piano (2004)
Chinese Ancient Dances, for soprano saxophone and piano (2006)
Eight Visions, a new anthology for flute and piano (2009)
Fisherman's Song, for violin and piano (1999)
From Old Peking Folklore, for violin and piano (2009)
The Golden Flute, solo flute with piano reduction (1999)
Happy Tune (III. Dou Duo from 'Three Bagatelles'), for two cellos
Meditation, two songs for voice and piano (2006)
Nian Hua, for two guitars (2017)
Ox Tail Dance (No. 1 from Chinese Ancient Dances), for horn and piano (2006)
Romance and Dance, for violin and piano (2001)
Romance of Hsiao and Ch'In, for cello and piano (2001)
Seven Muses, a contemporary anthology for flute and piano (1986)
The Soulful and The Perpetual, for alto saxophone and piano (2013)
Three Bagatelles from China West, duet for flute and piano (2006)
Three Bagatelles from China West, for B-flat (or E-flat) clarinet and piano (2009)
Three Bagatelles from China West, for flute and guitar
Three Bagatelles from China West, for contrabass and piano
Three Bagatelles from China West, for violin and cello
Three Bagatelles from China West, for flute and B-flat clarinet
Three Bagatelles, for guanzi and sheng

Chamber ensemble (3 or more performers)

As in a Dream, for violin, cello, and soprano
As in a Dream, for soprano, pipa, and zheng
As Like A Raging Fire, for flute, clarinet, violin, cello, and piano
At the Kansas City Chinese New Year Concert, for string quartet
Blue Dragon Sword Dance (from "At the Kansas City Chinese New Year Concert"), for string quartet
Burning, for string quartet (2004)
Chinese Fables, for erhu, pipa, cello, and percussion
Eleanor's Gift, for cello, percussion, and piano
Feng, for woodwind quintet
Fiddle Suite, for huqin and string quartet
Fire, for twelve players
From the Path of Beauty, for string quartet
The Han Figurines, for violin, B-flat clarinet, B-flat tenor saxophone, double bass, piano, and percussion
Happy Rain On A Spring Night, for flute, clarinet, violin, cello, and piano
Joy of the Reunion, for oboe, violin, viola, and double bass
Near Distance, for chamber ensemble
Night Thoughts, for flute, cello, and piano (2004)
Ning, for violin, cello, and pipa
Not Alone, for SATB saxophone quartet (2017)
Qi, for flute, cello, percussion, and piano
Septet, for erhu, pipa, percussion, and saxophone quartet
Shuo, for string quartet
Song In Winter, for di, zheng, and harpsichord
Song In Winter, for flute, zheng, piano, and percussion
Sound of the Five, for solo cello and string quartet
Sparkle (Octet), for flute (doubling piccolo), E-flat clarinet, two percussionists, piano, violin, cello and double bass
Suite for Cello and Chamber Winds
Three Dances from China South, for dizi, erhu, pipa, and zheng
Tibetan Tunes, for piano trio (2008)
Tunes From My Home, trio for violin, cello, and piano
Woodwind Quintet
Woodwind Quintet No. 3 (Suite From China West for Woodwind Quintet)
Wu Yu, for flute, clarinet, bassoon, percussion, violin, and cello
Wu Yu, for flute, clarinet, oboe, violin, viola, violoncello, and contrabass
Xian Shi, for viola, piano, and percussion
YangKo, for solo violin and two percussionists

Vocal/Choral

Angel Island Passages, for children's choir and string quartet
Arirang, for a cappella SATB chorus (1999)
The Bronze Taotie (Movement 1 From "From The Path Of Beauty"), for mixed chorus
Capriccio, for SATB chorus, solo percussion, and organ
Chinese Mountain Songs, for a cappella treble chorus (2002)
Chinese Poems, for SSAA chorus (2000)
Distance Can't Keep Us Two Apart, for a capella SATB chorus (2012)
From the Path of Beauty, for SATB chorus and string quartet
A Horseherd's Mountain Song (From "Two Chinese Folk Songs"), for a cappella SATB chorus (2006)
I Hear The Siren's Call, for a cappella SATB chorus (2013)
Know You How Many Petals Falling?, for a cappella SATB chorus (2003)
Landscape, for a cappella SATB chorus (2004)
Let's Reach A New Height, for a cappella SATB chorus (2013)
Looking At The Sea, for a cappella SSA chorus
Sakura, Sakura, for a cappella SATBB chorus (1999)
A Set Of Chinese Folk Songs, for men's chorus
A Set Of Chinese Folk Songs (Volume 1), for SATB chorus and optional piano (1994)
A Set Of Chinese Folk Songs (Volume 2), for SATB chorus and optional piano (1994)
A Set Of Chinese Folk Songs (Volume 3), for SATB chorus and optional piano (1998)
Shady Grove, for a cappella SATB chorus (2004)
A Single Bamboo Can Easily Bend (From "Two Chinese Folk Songs"), for a cappella SATB chorus (2006)
Spring Dreams, for a cappella SSAATTBB chorus (1999)
Spring Rain, for a cappella SATB chorus (2011)
Tang Poems, for a cappella male choir
To The New Millennium, for soprano solo, mezzo-soprano solo, and a cappella SATB chorus (2002)
Two Chinese Folk Songs (1. The Flowing Stream, 2. The Sun Is Rising With Our Joy), for SSAATTBB chorus
The West Lake, for a cappella SATB chorus (2004)
With Flowers Blooming, for a cappella SSA chorus (2011)
Written On A Rainy Night (From Tang Poems), for a cappella SATB chorus (1995)
Written On A Rainy Night, for a cappella men's chorus
Xuan, for a cappella SATB chorus (2002)

Chorus and ensemble
Chinese Myths Cantata
Early Spring, for mixed choir and chamber ensemble
From the Path of Beauty, for mixed choir and string quartet
KC Capriccio, for wind ensemble and mixed chorus
A Set of Chinese Folk Songs, for children's SA(T) chorus and strings
Tang Poems Cantata, for SATB chorus and chamber orchestra

Orchestra

Blue, Blue Sky, large orchestra (2012)
Caramoor's Summer, chamber orchestra (2014)
Celebration, large orchestra (2014)
Duo Ye, chamber orchestra (1985)
Duo Ye No. 2, full orchestra (1987)
Faith and Perseverance, large orchestra
Fountains Of KC, large orchestra (2011)
Ge Xu (Antiphony), large orchestra (2014)
Introduction, Andante, and Allegro (2018), full orchestra
Jing Diao, large orchestra (2011)
The Linear, large orchestra (1994)
Momentum, large orchestra (1998)
Mount a Long Wind, large orchestra (2010)
Overture, youth orchestra (2008)
Prelude and Fugue, chamber orchestra (2009)
Prospect Overture, large orchestra (2008)
Rhyme of Fire, large orchestra (2008)
Shuo, string orchestra (1994)
Si Ji (Four Seasons), large orchestra (2005)
Sprout, string orchestra (1986)
Symphony No. 4 'Humen 1839', large orchestra (2009)
Symphony No. 2, large orchestra (1993)
Symphony No. 3, large orchestra (2003–04)
Tone Poem, chamber orchestra
Tu, for orchestra

Orchestra with soloist(s)

The Ancient Beauty
The Ancient Chinese Beauty, for recorders and string orchestra
Ba Yin (The Eight Sounds), for saxophone quartet and string orchestra
Ballad, Dance and Fantasy, for cello and orchestra
Chinese Folk Dance Suite, for violin and orchestra
Chinese Rap, for violin and orchestra
Concerto for Reeds, for oboe, sheng, and chamber orchestra
Dunhuang Fantasy, concerto for organ and chamber wind ensemble
Eleanor's Gift, for solo cello and orchestra
Fiddle Suite, for huqin and orchestra
Fiddle Suite, for huqin and string orchestra
Four Spirits, concerto for piano and orchestra
The Golden Flute, concerto for flute and orchestra
Percussion Concerto, for solo percussion and orchestra
Piano Concerto
Romance and Dance, for two solo violins and string orchestra
Romance of Hsiao and Ch'in (First Movement of "Romance and Dance"), for two violins and string orchestra
Southern Scenes, a double concerto for flute, pipa, and orchestra
Spring in Dresden, for violin and orchestra
Suite for Cello and Chamber Winds
Xian Shi, for viola and orchestra

Band/Wind ensemble
Ba Yin (The Eight Sounds), for saxophone quartet and wind ensemble
Dragon Rhyme, for symphonic band
Spring Festival, for symphonic band
Suite From China West, for wind ensemble
Tu, for wind ensemble
Wind, for wind ensemble

See also
Down to the Countryside Movement

References

 Liner Notes, Chen Yi's Sound of the Five

External links
 Chen Yi's page at Theodore Presser Company
 Chen Yi page from The Living Composers Project site
 Interview with Chen Yi, December 14, 2005
 Chen Yi page from UMKC Conservatory

1953 births
Living people
Musicians from Guangzhou
Central Conservatory of Music alumni
Columbia University School of the Arts alumni
20th-century classical composers
21st-century classical composers
Cantonese people
Chinese classical violinists
People's Republic of China composers
Musicians from New York (state)
University of Missouri–Kansas City faculty
Chinese women classical composers
Educators from Guangdong
Chinese classical composers
Sent-down youths
21st-century American composers
20th-century American women musicians
20th-century American composers
21st-century American women musicians
21st-century classical violinists
20th-century women composers
21st-century women composers
21st-century American violinists